The flag of Chukotka Autonomous Okrug is a blue field charged with a white triangle at the hoist side. At the center of the triangle is a roundel of the Russian national flag rimmed with a thick yellow border.

The blue is the national color of the Chukchi people. It also symbolizes the rivers within the autonomous okrug. The white symbolizes the ice and snow, which covers Chukotka for most of the year. The yellow symbolizes the sun, hope, and friendship.

Historical Flags

References

Flags of the World

Flag
Flags of the federal subjects of Russia
Flags of the Arctic